The Manichaean Turpan documents found in Bezeklik Thousand Buddha Caves include many documents and works of Manichaean art found by the German Turfan expeditions.

History
Many important finds were made by the Turfan expeditions, especially on the second expedition, at a number of sites along the ancient northern route around the Taklamakan desert.

Manuscripts
Manuscripts include Sogdian-language Manichaean letter.

Art
Visual art includes:
Leaf from a Manichaean book MIK III 4959
Leaf from a Manichaean book MIK III 4974
Leaf from a Manichaean book MIK III 4979
Leaf from a Manichaean book MIK III 6368
Manichaean temple banner MIK III 6286
Manichaean wall painting MIK III 6918

Gallery

References

Manichaean art
Turpan